The Croatian Football Super Cup is a football match between the winners of the Croatian national top league and football cup. The Super Cup is always held at the beginning of a new football season, and is only held when different clubs win the two most important competitions in the previous season (i.e. the match is not played when a club completes the domestic double).

Since the establishment of Croatian football competitions in 1992, the two local powerhouses Dinamo, Hajduk and HNK Rijeka won doubles on twelve occasions (Dinamo Zagreb 11, Hajduk Split 1, Rijeka 1). The Super Cup wasn't held in periods between 1995–2001, 2007–2009, 2011–2012 and 2015–2018. On three occasions the Super Cup was not played for various reasons - in 1999 Dinamo refused to play Osijek saying the fixture did not fit into their schedule and in 2000 and 2001 Hajduk Split and Dinamo Zagreb could not agree on the rules and whether it should be played as a single match or over two legs, and in what order.

In 2002 the Croatian Football Federation took over the organisation of the Super Cup and made it an official single-legged fixture, with 30 minutes of extra time followed by a penalty shoot-out if necessary, which must be played a week before the following football season kicks off.

Since 2002, the match has always been hosted by the club which won the league title, with the exception of 2002 when NK Zagreb were reigning champions, but chose to "host" the match at crosstown rivals Dinamo's Maksimir Stadium saying that playing at Maksimir would help them prepare for their upcoming UEFA Champions League qualifying fixture. Their home stadium at Kranjčevićeva had been declared unfit for UEFA competitions and they were forced to host their European ties at Maksimir.

Winners
Dinamo Zagreb (7 times), Hajduk Split (5 times) and Rijeka (1 time) are the only clubs who won the Super Cup. Seven out of thirteen Super Cup matches played so far have been decided in Eternal Derbies featuring Hajduk and Dinamo.

Key

Results by team
Only five clubs participated in the Super Cup since 1992. Osijek also qualified for the Super Cup by winning the 1998–99 Croatian Football Cup, but the match was not held as clubs could not agree on the date of the fixture.

Winning managers

By individual

Match details

1992

1993

First leg

Second leg

4–4 on aggregate, Hajduk Split won on away goals

1994

First leg

Second leg

1–1 on aggregate, Hajduk Split won 4–3 on penalty shoot-out

2002

2003

2004

2005

2006

2010

2013

2014

2019

2022

Notes

External links
Croatia Super Cup Finals, RSSSF.com

 
Croatia
S
Recurring sporting events established in 1992
1992 establishments in Croatia